Talal Hawsawi (born 29 August 1998) is a Saudi Arabian footballer who plays as a defender for Al-Shoulla.

Career
Hawsawi started his career at the youth teams of Al-Ahli. He left the club in July 2018 without making an appearance for the senior team. On 24 August 2018, Hawsawi joined MS League side Najran. On 19 July 2019, he renewed his contract for another year. On 26 October 2020, Hawsawi joined Pro League side Al-Qadsiah. On 21 August 2021, Hawsawi joined MS League side on loan until the end of the season. On 31 January 2023, Hawsawi was released by Al-Qadsiah. On the same day, Hawsawi joined Al-Shoulla.

References

External links
 
 

Living people
1998 births
Sportspeople from Jeddah
Association football defenders
Saudi Arabian footballers
Saudi Arabia youth international footballers
Al-Ahli Saudi FC players
Najran SC players
Al-Qadsiah FC players
Al-Kholood Club players
Al-Shoulla FC players
Saudi First Division League players
Saudi Professional League players